Kilwinning is one of the nine wards used to elect members of the North Ayrshire council. Created in 2007 to cover the town of Kilwinning, it elects four councillors. Its southern boundary is mostly formed by the A78 road. It was unaffected by both a national boundary review prior to the 2017 local elections and a further re-organisation for the 2022 election in relation to the Islands (Scotland) Act 2018. In 2020, the ward's population was 17,237.

Councillors

Election Results

2022 Election
2022 North Ayrshire Council election

Source:

2017 Election
2017 North Ayrshire Council election

2012 Election
2012 North Ayrshire Council election

2007 Election
2007 North Ayrshire Council election

References

Wards of North Ayrshire
Kilwinning